Anselmo Zarza Bernal (June 4, 1916 – April 15, 2014) was a Mexican bishop in the Roman Catholic Church. Bernal was born in Atlixco, Puebla in June 1916. He was ordained a priest in 1939. He was the Bishop of Linares, Nuevo León, from 1962 to 1966 and the Bishop of León, Guanajuato, from 1966 to 1992. Bernal died in León, Guanajuato in April 2014 at the age of 97.

References
 Bishops of Mexico
 Anselmo Zarza Bernal at the Catholic Hierarchy

1916 births
2014 deaths
20th-century Roman Catholic bishops in Mexico
20th-century Roman Catholic theologians
Participants in the Second Vatican Council
People from Atlixco
People from León, Guanajuato